The Best of Faron Young Vol. 2 is a compilation album by American country music singer and songwriter Faron Young, released in 1977 by Mercury Records. The album, composed of tracks recorded between 1970 and 1976, reached No. 24 on the US country music chart.

Track listing
Side 1
"It's Four in the Morning" (Jerry Chesnut) – 2:55
"I'd Just be Fool Enough" (Melvin Endsley) – 3:00
"Goin' Steady" (F. Young) – 2:04
"Another You" (J. Peppers) – 2:17
"Leavin' and Sayin' Goodbye" (J. Seeley) – 2:26
"(The Worst You Ever Gave Me Was) The Best I Ever Had" (D. Hice/R. Hice)" – 2:28

Side 2
"Here I am in Dallas" (L. Morris/R. Hughes/T. Ishmall) – 2:35
"Some Kind of Woman" (J. Peppers/T. Cash) – 2:35
"She Fights That Lovin' Feeling" (J. Adams) – 2:51
"Feel Again" (J. M. Virgin) – 2:38
"This Little Girl of Mine" (J. Crutchfield) – 2:57
"Step Aside" (R. Griff) – 2:41

Singles chart positions

Production
Produced by Jerry Kennedy
String arrangements by Cam Mullins
Recorded at U.S. Recording Studios Inc. and Mercury Custom Recording Studio, Nashville, Tennessee
Mastering by M. C. Rather, Columbia Record Productions.
Album cover illustration by John Youssi

References

1977 compilation albums
Faron Young albums
Mercury Records compilation albums
Albums produced by Jerry Kennedy